Acacia anaticeps, also known as duck-headed wattle, is a shrub or tree of the genus Acacia and the subgenus Plurinerves. It is native to arid areas of north western Australia.

Description
Like most species of Acacia it has phyllodes rather than true leaves. It blooms from April to June and produces yellow flowers.

Distribution
It is endemic to arid areas in the Kimberley and Pilbara regions of Western Australia where it is often situated on sand dunes and pindan country growing in red sandy or sandy-loamy soils. The range of the plant extends from the northern boundary of the Pilbara region northwards to around Broome in the north west to around Kumpupintil Lake and Lake Gregory in the east and is sometimes found on heavier, sometimes saline, soils.

See also
List of Acacia species

References

anaticeps
Acacias of Western Australia
Plants described in 1972
Taxa named by Mary Tindale